International Community School (ICS) is a small 6-12th grade public school in the Lake Washington School District of Washington State. It has about 60 students per grade. It is part of a series of schools founded by Dr. Bruce Saari. "International" in the school's name reflects an international focus in curriculum, and it is not an international school in the usual sense.

ICS is a choice school, for which an application must be submitted, and is not part of the Lake Washington School District middle-to-high school feeder system. All complete applications are entered into a lottery to select those who will be admitted. In the event that there is space available in excess of the applications submitted by in-district students, applications by out-of-district students are allowed. In recent years, there have been over 800 applications for the 65 or more spots available yielding a chance of less than 10% to be admitted.

The school offers an integrated six year Humanities/International Studies core curriculum, as well as Art for 5 years, instead of the regular no art/LA/SS(Language Arts/Social Studies). Each year also has rigorous Science and Math classes. Additionally, students study Spanish, for at least four years, with the intention of achieving fluency. All classes in 9-12 grade are Honors or AP classes. The curriculum is fixed and the same for all students until Junior year when there is one elective,  and Senior year when there are 4 electives.  Every year in May students go on a theme-based Focus Week where they enrich themselves through travel or local activities, leaving "the confines of the classroom to expand their knowledge".

The mascot for ICS is the Phoenix, and the motto is "Forever We Rise".

Rankings
The International Community School has been recognized as one of the best high schools in the United States, public or private. In every year since it was founded, ICS students have achieved top-tier scores on national and state achievement tests like Washington Assessment of Student Learning (WASL) test, the High School Proficiency Exam (HSPE), and Smarter Balanced Assessment Consortium (SBAC). 100% of students participate in AP classes with essentially all students receiving passing grades. As a result, ICS has been ranked among the top high schools in the United States in multiple rankings. From 2007 to 2014 it was selected as a Gold Medal School, ranking between 10th-30th out of the top 100 schools in US News' Best High School list. In 2014, the International Community School was ranked 13th in the nation by U.S. News & World Report. From 2008 to 2014, Newsweek selected ICS as one of the Public Elites, one of the best high schools in the U.S. In the 2012 OECD PISA evaluation, ICS was ranked as the number 1 school in Math, number 4 in reading, and number 7 in Science of all U.S. high schools participating in the evaluation. In 2005, it was selected as a No Child Left Behind—Blue Ribbon School of Excellence. In 2019, U.S. News & World Report ranked ICS as 76th among all high schools in the United States.

Location
The school is located in Kirkland, Washington, a suburb of Seattle, Washington, and serves students from the Lake Washington School District.

History

Founding

The school was proposed to the Lake Washington School District by parents in 1997 and its program and policies were developed by Dr. Bruce Saari who modeled it after the Bellevue International School, where he had been program developer the previous six years.  
Up until July 2011, Cindy Duenas was the principal of ICS.  After the 2010-2011 school year, Duenas left to help start the new STEM (Science, Technology, Engineering and Math) school for the Lake Washington School District. She was replaced by Dr. Matthew Livingston in 2011. He was replaced in 2014 by Dr. Gregory Moncada. Moncada was replaced in 2017 by Margaret Kinney. In 2014, Andrya Packer, one of the school's humanities teachers, was selected to complete a Fulbright Scholarship in Scotland.

Expansion to modern facilities

Beginning in 2011, plans for the construction of a new 63,925 square foot building to replace the former building were created by the school's faculty and the school district. Construction of the adjacent new building began in June 2012 and finished in August 2013, prior to the start of the 2013-2014 school year. The old building was destroyed and replaced by the current soccer field and parking lot. The new facility sits on 11.2 acres of land and cost $18 million to build.

In September 2013, students entered the school with modern classrooms and laboratories. The new school includes a centralized commons nicknamed "The Lyceum" for school assemblies, theatrical performances and for use as a cafeteria. Later in the new building's first school year, bleachers were installed in the commons for better seating for the upperclassmen.

Admissions and enrollment

Prior to 2012

Because of the limited enrollment, before 2012 students were chosen from applicants from Lake Washington School District's 7th grade class by lottery, and there were limited opportunities for transfer into higher grades after being put on a waitlist. After the school district moved from a K-6 elementary school system to a standard K-5 elementary school in Fall 2012, which changed the admissions of ICS to be in 6th grade. The school has a grandfather clause allowing for students who are members of founding families or who had sibling in the first class of the school to be admitted without going through the lottery system.

Introduction of 6th graders

Beginning from the 2013-2014 school year and coinciding with the larger change among the school district, 6th graders were given admission to ICS. The application process and lottery were moved upward for 5th graders, and the waitlist process remained the same. There are currently only about 30 of the original students from the first 6th grade class left (there were originally over 60). They were the first ones to go to a 6th grade day camp. The same year ICS introduced a 6th grade class, a time capsule was made and was set to be opened 100 years later.

Demographics

As of 2020-21, ICS had an enrollment of 429 students, with minorities consisting of 47% of the total student body. The total demographic of the school can be broken down into the following: 
 36% Caucasian
 54% Asian
 3% Hispanic
 0% Pacific-Islander
 6% Two or More Races

The ratio of male students to female students is 48:52.

Academics

The school has a student-teacher ratio of 18.76, with 19 full-time teachers, and has a 98% graduation rate.

Focus Week

Every May, ICS sends its students outside the classroom environment for a week to "explore concepts outside those normally encountered in schools". Students select the Focus Week that they have interest in and are placed in a small group to meet with throughout the school year. Each group is assigned a faculty adviser who helps plan, organize, and schedule the itinerary for the week-long education experience. Focus Weeks this year include international trips to Greece, Japan, the Netherlands, and Iceland, domestic trips including New York and The Grand Canyon, and local trips, such as Circus Arts, Teacher's Assistants, Seattle International Film Festival, and Blue Ribbon Cooking.

Student life

Student government

The student body of the International Community School is represented by the Associated Student Body, a group of elected who serve the student body in three key areas: facilitating dialogue between the students and the faculty, improving the quality of student life through school-sponsored events, and managing the oversight of the school's extracurricular activities. The vision of the Associated Student Body is as follows: "Members of the ICS ASB are servant leaders whose purpose is to build and strengthen a sense of community for all members of the ICS family. Our purpose is not just to do events, but also to live as leaders".

Extracurricular clubs

ICS has a variety of clubs, ranging from pre-professional clubs to drama.

The school offers various honor societies, including the National Honor Society, the National Science Honor Society, and the National Art Honor Society. Students must have at least sophomore status to apply and acceptance is given based on a student's academic achievements (at least 3.0 GPA for NHS).

ICS has a local Key Club (Kiwanis Empowering Youth) chapter. The program is an internationally recognized high school youth-based organization which provides opportunities for its members to become involved in the community by volunteering and serving in areas that need assistance.

The ICS Future Business Leaders of America (FBLA) chapter, one of the largest chapters in Washington, is recognized as a State Gold Seal Chapter. Students perform in regional, state, and national competitions that range from Economics to Graphic Design to Business Communications, and has a history of competing well. The chapter has won numerous individual and team awards on the local, state, and national level. To subsidize traveling costs to competitions, FBLA hosts fundraisers such as Tolo. Such events along with service projects allow members to gain confidence and skills required for future careers. FBLA is open to 9th-12th graders.

The International Community School Mock Trial team allows students to simulate realistic jury trials. Combining debate with drama, the club prepares two 15-person teams for competitions at the regional and state level. In recent years, the Mock Trial team has continuously placed in the Top 5 at the state level. The club teaches hard-working students about civil liberties, public speaking, legal reasoning and impromptu problem-solving.

While the school does not have a debate team, students who are interested in debate are encouraged to join the Model United Nations club. The club is a simulation of the United Nations that aims to educate participants about civics, effective communication, globalization and multilateral diplomacy. Every year, a delegation of students travel to compete in conferences. Many former ICS students have received honorary recognition in their part of the diplomacy simulation.

A Drama program is offered after school. It produces between two and four performances a year.

In 2013, a CODE Club was established to encourage young students to become more involved in computer science and programming. This has been successful in conjunction with the addition of the school's AP Computer Science program.

2015 saw the establishment of ICS' Authors' Society, a writing club meant to help students with the basics of storytelling and creative writing. Their partnerships with the Gender Sexuality Alliance (GSA) and Technology Students' Association (TSA) have yielded several publications, which provide club members with both an incentive to share their work and to make sales for the benefit of clubs and social causes.

Sports

ICS is not part of the KingCo high school division for sports and does not have any sports teams. Since ICS accepts any student in the Lake Washington School District, it is prohibited from sports competition. Should students choose participate in sports, they can do so at their "home school" (the Lake Washington School District neighborhood high school that corresponds with their home address.)

References

External links
 LWSD Profile Page of International Community School
 International Community School Web Site
 Lake Washington School District
 About ICS

High schools in King County, Washington
Schools in Kirkland, Washington
Public high schools in Washington (state)
Public middle schools in Washington (state)